Petr Johana (born 1 November 1976 in Most) is a former Czech professional footballer who lastly played for FK SIAD Most in the Czech National Football League.

Career
Johana has played as a defender for Vestel Manisaspor in the Turkish Super League. Previous clubs he had played for during his career as a player before joining the Turkish League were FC MUS Most, FC Slovan Liberec and Sparta Prague.

He made his debut for the Czech Republic in a June 2001 World Cup qualification match against Denmark and has earned 13 caps, scoring one goal. His final international game was a November 2003 friendly match against Canada.

Honours
Czech League (2):
 2002, 2005
Czech Cup (2):
 2000, 2004

External links
 
 
 
 

1976 births
Living people
Sportspeople from Most (city)
Czech footballers
Czech Republic international footballers
FC Slovan Liberec players
AC Sparta Prague players
FK Mladá Boleslav players
Manisaspor footballers
FK Baník Most players
Expatriate footballers in Turkey
Czech expatriate sportspeople in Turkey
Expatriate footballers in Austria
Czech expatriate sportspeople in Austria
Czech First League players
Süper Lig players
Association football defenders
SC Wiener Neustadt players